Sefer Talat Özkarslı (21 March 1938 – 10 June 2020), nicknamed Koçero, was a Turkish football manager and player who played as a defender. Özkarslı is best known for his stint with Galatasaray from 1961 to 1971, where he helped them win three Süper Lig titles and seven other domestic trophies.

Professional career
Özkarslı began playing football with his local side Şehreküstü. He was an all-star athlete who excelled in athletics, and after years of amateur success transferred to Göztepe. In 1961, Gündüz Kılıç convinced him to transfer to Galatasaray after and spent ten years there. After his tenure at Galatasaray, Özkarslı played for three years with his local club Gaziantepspor, and promoted them from the third division to the first division. Later in life, he briefly became their manager. On 5 February 2018 in Gaziantep the sports hall "Talat Özkarslı Kapalı Spor Salonu" was opened and named after Özkarslı, and a large major street was also named after him.

Honours
Galatasaray
Süper Lig (4): 1961–62, 1962–63, 1968–69, 1970–71
Turkish Cup (3): 1962–63, 1963–64, 1965–66
TSYD Cup (3): 1963–1964, 1966–1967, 1967–68
Turkish Super Cup (1): 1968–69

Turkey
ECO Cup: 1967

References

External links
 
 
 Mackolik Manager Profile

1938 births
2020 deaths
Sportspeople from Gaziantep
Turkish footballers
Turkey international footballers
Turkey B international footballers
Turkey youth international footballers
Turkish football managers
Association football defenders
Gaziantepspor footballers
Galatasaray S.K. footballers
Göztepe S.K. footballers
Süper Lig players
TFF First League players
Gaziantepspor managers
Süper Lig managers